Rajko Petrov Nogo (13 May 1945 – 28 November 2022) was a Serbian poet, essayist and literary critic.

Biography
Nogo was born on 13 May 1945 after the end of the Second World War to parents Petar and Stana, in Borija near Kalinovik (in the old Herzegovina region of Zagorje) into a family descending from the Kuči tribe in Montenegro. From his father's name, he made the patronymic Petrov which he added to his name.

As a boy, he moved from his native Borija to Sarajevo and began his education there. After elementary school, he graduated from the Teaching School in Sarajevo and graduated in Yugoslav literature and Serbo-Croatian language at the University of Sarajevo Faculty of Philosophy, and received his master's degree at the University of Belgrade Faculty of Philology. He worked as an editor in the Veselin Masleša Publishing Company from 1972 to 1982, then as an editor in Belgrade's BIGZ publishing house from 1982 to 1999.

Nogo moved from Sarajevo to Belgrade in 1982.

From 2000, he taught poetry and literary criticism at the Faculty of Philosophy of the University of East Sarajevo. He was elected a corresponding member of the Academy of Sciences and Arts of the Republic of Srpska on 27 June 1997, and a regular member on 21 June 2004. He was a member of the Association of Writers of Serbia. On 30 March 2012, the Board of Directors of the Association of Writers of Serbia proposed him as a corresponding member of the Serbian Academy of Sciences and Arts.

Nogo died on 28 November 2022, at the age of 77.

References

1945 births
2022 deaths
People from Kalinovik
Serbs of Bosnia and Herzegovina
Serbian male poets
Serbian male essayists
Serbian non-fiction writers
Serbian literary critics
Serbian philologists
Literary critics of Serbian
20th-century Serbian poets
University of Sarajevo alumni
University of Belgrade Faculty of Philology alumni
Members of the Academy of Sciences and Arts of the Republika Srpska
Burials at Belgrade New Cemetery